Bindja Airport  is an airport serving Bindja, a hamlet on the Lukenie River in Mai-Ndombe Province, Democratic Republic of the Congo.

See also

 Transport in the Democratic Republic of the Congo
 List of airports in the Democratic Republic of the Congo

References

External links
 OpenStreetMap - Bindja Airport
 FallingRain - Bindja Airport
 HERE Maps - Bindja Airport
 OurAirports - Bindja Airport
 

Airports in Mai-Ndombe Province